The cutterman insignia is a device awarded by the United States Coast Guard to represent service aboard a Coast Guard cutter. The pin is awarded on a temporary basis after six months of sea time, qualification in required watch stations, successful completion of an oral or written board, and receiving a recommendation from their unit's commanding officer. Temporary insignias may be worn while attached to a cutter, but must be removed upon permanently transferring to a non-afloat unit. The award becomes permanent after 5 years of cumulative sea time in the Coast Guard (prior service sea time counts for pay purposes, but not for qualification as a cutterman).

On 18 October 1974, the Office of Personnel promulgated the Coast Guard Cutterman Insignia program, to “recognize the contributions and qualifications of our personnel.” The version awarded to officers is gold-toned, while the version awarded to enlisted members is pewter-toned.

The United States Coast Guard Auxiliary also issues a version of the cutterman insignia that requires a minimum of two years serving at least 52 days per year aboard a cutter, 65 feet in length or greater, and including a minimum of 24 of those days being served underway. The insignia design is identical in size and form to the cutterman insignia. A pewter auxiliary emblem is superimposed in the center of the bronze-tone stylized waves.

See also

 Badges of the United States Coast Guard
 United States Coast Guard Cutter

References

Badges of the United States Coast Guard